Lavanchy is a surname. Notable people with the surname include:

Gene Lavanchy (born 1964), American radio and television personality
Marisa Lavanchy (born 1990), Swiss sprinter
Numa Lavanchy (born 1993), Swiss footballer
Pascal Lavanchy (born 1968), French ice dancer

French-language surnames